is a fighting video game produced by BROCCOLI. The game features Eva units and Angels from Neon Genesis Evangelion battling each other.  The game is a platform fighter with fully 3D rendered backgrounds and environments.  The Story Mode features individual arcs for Asuka Langley Soryu, Shinji Ikari, Tōji Suzuhara, Kensuke Aida, Rei Ayanami and Kaworu Nagisa. Every playable unit can also do two special attacks that unleashes a devastating attack.

Playable Units

: denotes characters exclusive to the PSP release)

Reception
The PlayStation Portable version of the game sold 7,082 copies the week of its release.

References

External links
  Neon Genesis Evangelion Battle Orchestra
 NCS page Comments about gameplay, characters, and featuring a link to screenshots of the game

2007 video games
Japan-exclusive video games
Multiplayer and single-player video games
Neon Genesis Evangelion games
Platform fighters
PlayStation 2 games
PlayStation Portable games
Fighting games
Video games developed in Japan
Broccoli (company) games